In mathematics, BF algebras are a class of algebraic structures arising out of a symmetric "Yin Yang" concept for Bipolar Fuzzy logic, the name was introduced by Andrzej Walendziak in 2007.  The name covers discrete versions, but a canonical example arises in the BF space [-1,0]x[0,1] of pairs of (false-ness, truth-ness).

Definition
A BF-algebra is a non-empty subset  with a constant  and a binary operation  satisfying the following:

Example 
Let  be the set of integers and '' be the binary operation 'subtraction'. Then the algebraic structure  obeys the following properties:

References

Algebraic structures